Antonio Graziani (21 November 1620 – May, 1684) was a Roman Catholic prelate who served as Bishop of Boiano (1666–1684).

Biography
Antonio Graziani was born on 21 November 1620.  On 15 February 1666, he was appointed by Pope Alexander VII as Bishop of Boiano. He served as Bishop of Boiano until his death in May 1684. While bishop, he served as the principal co-consecrator of Agostino Flavio Macedonich, Bishop of Stagno, Arcangelo de Chilento, Bishop of L’Aquila, Ignatius Fiumi, Bishop of Polignano, and Bernardino Masseri, Bishop of Anagni.

References

External links and additional sources
 (for Chronology of Bishops) 
 (for Chronology of Bishops) 

1620 births
1684 deaths
17th-century Italian Roman Catholic bishops
Bishops appointed by Pope Alexander VII